Robert Ian Campbell,  is a former senior Australian public servant and policymaker.

Life and career
Ian Campbell joined the Australian Public Service in 1972. He worked in various departments and agencies, including the Department of the Treasury and the Australian Electoral Commission, where he was the Australian Electoral Commissioner between 2005 and 2008.

Campbell was appointed Secretary of the Department of Veterans' Affairs in September 2008.

Campbell retired from his Secretary position and the public service in 2013, due to his ill health.

Awards
Campbell was awarded the Public Service Medal for outstanding public service in the administration of electoral processes in Australia and in the development and implementation of improved entitlements for Australia's veteran community, in January 2008. He was made an Officer of the Order of Australia in January 2014 for distinguished service to public administration through innovative policy development, reform and administration at the national level, particularly the provision of services for veterans and their families.

References

Living people
Year of birth missing (living people)
Recipients of the Public Service Medal (Australia)
Officers of the Order of Australia
Secretaries of the Australian Government Veterans' Affairs Department
University of New South Wales alumni